is a Japanese ski jumper who has competed since 2006.

His best individual result was in 2013 when he finished 2nd at Klingenthal.

At the 2010 Winter Olympics in Vancouver, Takeuchi finished fifth in the team large hill, 34th in the individual normal hill, and 37th in the individual large hill events.

External links

1987 births
Living people
Japanese male ski jumpers
Olympic ski jumpers of Japan
Ski jumpers at the 2010 Winter Olympics
Ski jumpers at the 2014 Winter Olympics
Ski jumpers at the 2018 Winter Olympics
Olympic bronze medalists for Japan
Olympic medalists in ski jumping
Medalists at the 2014 Winter Olympics
FIS Nordic World Ski Championships medalists in ski jumping